The 2005 AAA Championships was an outdoor track and field competition organised by the Amateur Athletic Association (AAA), held from 9–10 July at the Manchester Regional Arena in Manchester, England. It was considered the de facto national championships for the United Kingdom.

Medal summary

Men

Women

References

AAA Championships
AAA Championships
Athletics Outdoor
AAA Championships
Sports competitions in Manchester
Athletics competitions in England